Fixed line numbers in Botswana are seven digits long in a closed telephone numbering plan, with the geographical area being indicated by the first two or three digits, meaning that there are no area codes. The country was allocated its own country code by the International Telecommunication Union, +267, in the late 1960s.

Calling formats
 xx xxxxx or xxx xxxxx – calling within Botswana
 +267 xx xxxxx or +267 xxx xxxxx – calling from outside Botswana
The NSN length is seven digits for fixed lines, and eight digits for VoIP and mobile ranges.

Until the 1990s, calls to Botswana could be made from South Africa using the regional code 0192.

General allocations

Fixed allocations in Botswana

Mobile numbers
Mobile numbers are eight digits long, with the first two digits indicating the network operator.

References

External links
Botswana Numbering Plan, Botswana Telecommunications Authority

Botswana
Botswana communications-related lists